Pedro Abad Santos y Basco (31 January 1876 – 15 January 1945) was a Filipino Marxist politician. He founded the Partido Sosyalista ng Pilipinas (PSP) or Philippine Socialist Party in 1929. He ran for several local elections but never won. Luis Taruc of the Hukbalahap Rebellion was under his tutelage and was his right-hand man.

Early years
Pedro Abad Santos was born to a wealthy family in the town of San Fernando in Pampanga. He was the eldest of the 10 children of Vicente Abad Santos and Toribia Basco (from Guagua, Pampanga). He is a brother of José Abad Santos, who would become chief justice of the Supreme Court of the Philippines. He was also the uncle of another Vicente Abad Santos, who would become an associate justice of the Philippine Supreme Court.

Pedro, or Perico as he was known, completed his secondary education at the Colegio de San Juan de Letran. He later enrolled in the University of Santo Tomas where he received his Doctor of Medicine. He later took and topped the medical board examinations.

After several years, he studied law by himself and took the bar examinations (this was allowed at the time), earning excellent scores.

Freedom fighter
There are no extant evidence of his activities during the Philippine Revolution of 1896 but he was already a major in the revolutionary forces, under Gen. Maximino Hizon, during the Philippine–American War. He was eventually captured by the Americans and sentenced to 25 years imprisonment for his guerrilla activities. But his family, who hired the prominent American lawyer John Haussermann to defend him during his trial, was able to secure a pardon.

Lawyer and politician
In 1906, Pedro was admitted to the bar and began a legal career that followed the career paths of politicians of his generation. From 1907 to 1909, he served as justice of the peace in his hometown. He served as councilor of his hometown from January 1910 to March 1912. From 1916 to 1922, he represented the second district of Pampanga in the House of Representatives of the Philippine Islands for two terms. In 1922, he was also a member of the Philippine Independence Mission to the United States, headed by Sergio Osmeña.

But in 1926, when his younger brother Jose was already an undersecretary in the Department of Justice of the American colonial government, Pedro lost the election for governor of Pampanga. He would never again serve in any official capacity in the colonial or Philippine governments.

Pioneer Filipino Marxist
Instead Pedro, who was already 50 years old, joined his friends Crisanto Evangelista, Antonio de Ora and Cirilo Bognot to study at the Lenin Institute in Moscow, in then Soviet Union.

Pedro's protégé, Luis Taruc, described Pedro as a Marxist but not a Bolshevik. Marxist principles found fertile ground in Pampanga and the other provinces of the Central Luzon region because of the poverty which farmers blamed on the land tenancy system prevalent at that time. Although the government repeatedly promised relief, land reform in the Philippines would not take off until the 1960s.

In the 1930s, Filipino farmers frequently came to bloody encounters with their landlords that the government had to send several units of the Philippine Constabulary to keep the peace.

On October 26, 1932, Pedro founded the Socialist Party of the Philippines when the Partido Komunista ng Pilipinas (PKP) was outlawed by the Supreme Court. Two years later, together with his assistants Agapito del Rosario, Luis Taruc, Lino Dizon, and others, he organized the Aguman ding Talapagobra ning Pilipinas (ATP) into the Aguman ding Maldang Talapagobra (AMT), similar to the general workers’ unions in Spain, Mexico and France, which advocated the expropriation of landed estates and friar lands, farmers’ cooperative stores and the upliftment of peasants’ living conditions. 

On November 7, 1938, during the 21st anniversary of the Russian Bolshevik Revolution, Filipino socialists and communists held a convention at the Manila Grand Opera House where they agreed to merge their organizations to form the Partido Komunista ng Pilipinas (Tagalog for Communist Party of the Philippines). Crisanto Evangelista was elected the organizations' president, Pedro Abad Santos its vice president, and Guillermo Capadocia its secretary general.

The following year, the administration of President Manuel Quezon formulated a reform program that was meant to address social problems in the Philippines. Quezon decided to launch it in Pampanga and Pedro's group organized a gathering of farmers and workers at San Fernando in February for the purpose.

Pedro's brother Jose, who was already Secretary of Justice, pleaded with Pedro not to embarrass Quezon when Pedro introduced the President. Dutifully, Pedro introduced the President as a "friend of the masses and the poor". But before Quezon spoke, Pedro enumerated farmers' grievances and criticized the legal system that, he said, landlords used against the poor. He challenged his brother, who was sitting beside Quezon, to clean up the courts and sarcastically remarked that the "secretary cannot help us if he just sits in his office".

Final years and death
On January 25, 1942, the Japanese occupation forces arrested Pedro, Crisanto Evangelista, Guillermo Capadocia, and other Filipino leaders. He was still incarcerated at Fort Santiago when his brother Jose, who was named Chief Justice of the Supreme Court in December of the previous year, was executed by the Japanese.

Pedro, who was then 66 years old, would stay in prison for two years, but he was released to his family because of a stomach ailment in 1944. After a few months of recuperation, he reported to President Jose Laurel, who refused to return him to Japanese custody.

A bachelor, he joined his protégé Luis Taruc, who had founded the guerilla force Hukbo ng Bayan Laban sa Hapon (Hukbalahap) (Tagalog for People's Army Against the Japanese). On January 15, 1945, Pedro succumbed to complications of his stomach ailment at a guerilla base in Minalin, Pampanga 16 days before he turned 69.

See also
 History of the Philippines
 José Abad Santos

References

 National Historical Institute, Filipinos in History Volume 1 (Manila: National Historical Institute, 1995)

Pedro
Colegio de San Juan de Letran alumni
20th-century Filipino lawyers
Filipino socialists
Filipino communists
Kapampangan people
Paramilitary Filipinos
University of Santo Tomas alumni
People of the Philippine–American War
1876 births
1945 deaths
Members of the House of Representatives of the Philippines from Pampanga
Filipino revolutionaries
Filipino trade union leaders
Anti-imperialism
Filipino people of Chinese descent
Filipino Freemasons
Filipino Roman Catholics
Anti-fascists
Socialist Party (Philippines) politicians
Nacionalista Party politicians
People from San Fernando, Pampanga
Members of the Philippine Legislature